The 2013 New Zealand Grand Prix event for open wheel racing cars was held at Manfeild Autocourse near Feilding on 10 February 2013. It was the fifty-eighth New Zealand Grand Prix and was open to Toyota Racing Series cars. The event was also the third race of the fifth round of the 2013 Toyota Racing Series, the final race of the series.

Twenty Tatuus-Toyota cars started the race which was won by New Zealander Nick Cassidy for the second time in succession, a feat last achieved by Simon Wills who won the race back to back in 1998 and 1999.

The M2 Competition team dominated the race, filling all three podium positions. Briton Alex Lynn finished second, 0.7 seconds behind Cassidy. Third was Dutch driver Steijn Schothorst.

Classification

Qualifying

Race

References

External links
 Toyota Racing Series

Grand Prix
New Zealand Grand Prix
Toyota Racing Series
February 2013 sports events in New Zealand